In sports, a winning percentage is the fraction of games or matches a team or individual has won. The statistic is commonly used in standings or rankings to compare teams or individuals. It is defined as wins divided by the total number of matches played (i.e. wins plus draws plus losses). A draw counts as a  win.

Discussion
For example, if a team's season record is 30 wins and 20 losses, the winning percentage would be 60% or 0.600:

 

If a team's season record is 30–15–5 (i.e. it has won thirty games, lost fifteen and tied five times), and in the five tie games are counted as 2 wins, and so the team has an adjusted record of 32 wins, resulting in a 65% or  winning percentage for the fifty total games from:

 

In North America, winning percentages are expressed as decimal values to three decimal places. It is the same value, but without the last step of multiplying by 100% in the formula above. Furthermore, they are usually read aloud as if they were whole numbers (e.g. 1.000, "a thousand" or 0.500, "five hundred"). In this case, the name "winning percentage" is actually a misnomer, since it is not expressed as a percentage. A winning percentage such as .536 ("five thirty-six") expressed as a percentage would be 53.6%.

Winning percentage is one way to compare the record of two teams; however, another standard method most frequently used in baseball and professional basketball standings is games behind. In baseball, a pitcher is assessed wins and losses as an individual statistic and thus has his own winning percentage, based on his win–loss record.

However, in association football, a manager's abilities may be measured by win percentage. In this case, the formula is wins divided by total number of matches; draws are not considered as "half-wins", and the quotient is always in percentage form.

In the National Football League, division winners and playoff qualifiers are technically determined by winning percentage and not by number of wins. Ties are currently counted as half a win and half a loss, however, prior to 1972 tied games were disregarded for the purposes of this calculation — a 10–2–2 record (10÷12 ≈ 0.833) would then have outranked an 11–3 record (11÷14 ≈ 0.785). Tie games, a fairly common occurrence in football before the introduction of overtime, were thus somewhat more valuable to teams with a winning record, as compared with current rules.

Some leagues and competitions may instead use a points percentage system, changing the nature of this statistic. In this type of method, used in many group tournament ranking systems, the competitors are awarded a certain number of points per win, fewer points per tie, and none for a loss. The teams are then ranked by the total number of these accumulated points. One such method is the "three points for a win", where three points are awarded for winning a game, one point is awarded for a draw, and no points are awarded for a loss. The National Hockey League (which uses an overtime and shootouts to break all ties) awards two points for a win in regulation or overtime/shootout, one point for an overtime loss, and none for a regulation loss.

Statistics

Major League Baseball
This table lists the best and worst winning percentages in the history of the National League (NL) and American League (AL) of Major League Baseball (MLB).

Note: some team records sum to less than the season schedule (154 or 162 games) due to rain outs.

National Basketball Association

National Hockey League
In the National Hockey League, teams are awarded two points for a win, and one point for either a tie (a discontinued statistic) or an overtime loss. It can be calculated as follows:

See also
Group tournament ranking system

References

Baseball statistics
Sports terminology
Percentages
Tournament systems